This is a list of mayors of Toledo, Ohio.

References

External links

Toledo, Ohio